Whitfield Records was a record label, founded in 1975 by former Motown producer and songwriter Norman Whitfield and active until 1982.  Whitfield Records was distributed throughout its entire existence by Warner Bros. Records.

Selected discography 
2967 - Method to the Madness - The Undisputed Truth [1976] (1/77) 
3019 - Nytro - Nytro [1977]
3074 - In Full Bloom - Rose Royce [1977] (8/77)
3124 - Music Web - Spyder Turner [1978]
3171 - Mammatapee! - Mammatapee [1980]
3202 - Smokin''' - Undisputed Truth [1979]
3226 - In Tune - Willie Hutch [1978] (11/78)
3227 - Strikes Again - Rose Royce [1978] (9/78)
3275 - Return to Nytropolis - Nytro [1979]
3331 - Back Street Boogie - Junior Walker  [1979]
3352 - Midnight Dancer - Willie Hutch [1979]
3387 - Rainbow Connection IV - Rose Royce [1979] (9/79)
3389 - The Girl's Alright with Me - Masterpiece [1980]
3397 - Only Love - Spyder Turner [1980]
3457 - Greatest Hits - Rose Royce [1980]
3510 - On the One - Mammatapee [1980]
3512 - Golden Touch - Rose Royce [1981] (1/81)
3620 - Jump Street'' - Rose Royce [1981]

See also
 List of record labels

References

Record labels established in 1975
Defunct record labels of the United States
Soul music record labels
Rhythm and blues record labels
Warner Records